Henry Fenn may refer to:

 Henry Edwin Fenn (1850–1913), British journalist
 Henry Courtenay Fenn (1894–1978), American sinologist
 Harry Fenn (1845–1911), English-born American illustrator